José de Udaeta (1919 in Barcelona, Spain – 2009 in Barcelona) was a Spanish dancer, castanet player and choreographer. His first performances in classical and modern ballet were made under a pseudonym, being the root for his development as a dancer, choreographer, teacher and castanet virtuoso and author for more than 50 years.

Awards 

 1987 Deutscher Tanzpreis
1989 Medalla de Bellas Artes
1995 Premi Nacional de Dansa de Catalunya 
2000 Medalla de oro del mérit de les arts , Barcelona
2001 la Creu de Saint Jordi

References

External links

Spanish male ballet dancers
Castanets players
1919 births
2009 deaths
Male dancers from Catalonia
People from Barcelona
Spanish choreographers